Now Barabbas is a 1949 British drama film directed by Gordon Parry and starring Richard Greene, Cedric Hardwicke and Kathleen Harrison. It is sometimes known as Now Barabbas Was a Robber. It was based on a 1947 play of the same title by William Douglas Home. The film features one of the earliest screen performances by Richard Burton.

It was shot at Teddington Studios.

Cast
 Richard Greene as Tufnell
 Cedric Hardwicke as Governor
 Kathleen Harrison as Mrs. Brown
 Ronald Howard as Roberts Bank Cashier
 Stephen Murray as Chaplain
 William Hartnell as Warder Jackson
 Beatrice Campbell as Kitty
 Richard Burton as Paddy
 Betty Ann Davies as Rosie
 Leslie Dwyer as Brown
 Alec Clunes as Gale
 Harry Fowler as Smith
 Kenneth More as Spencer
 Dora Bryan as Winnie
 Constance Smith as Jean
 Lily Kann as Woman
 David Hannaford as Erb Brown

References

Bibliography
 Alan Burton & Steve Chibnall. Historical Dictionary of British Cinema. Scarecrow Press, 2013.

External links

1949 films
1949 drama films
British prison drama films
Films directed by Gordon Parry
British films based on plays
Films with screenplays by Anatole de Grunwald
Films shot at Teddington Studios
Warner Bros. films
British black-and-white films
1940s prison films
1940s English-language films
1940s British films